is the 13th single by Japanese rock band TM Network, released on March 5, 1988 under Epic Records. Written by Mitsuko Komuro and Tetsuya Komuro, the song was used as the ending theme of the 1988 mecha anime film Mobile Suit Gundam: Char's Counterattack.

The single peaked at No. 4 on Oricon's singles chart. It was nominated for the Gold Award at the 30th Japan Record Awards.

In 2018, the song was ranked No. 4 on NHK's .

Track listing
All lyrics are written by Mitsuko Komuro; all music is composed and arranged by Tetsuya Komuro.

Chart position

Luna Sea version 

Japanese rock band Luna Sea covered the song as the third opening theme of the 2019 anime series Mobile Suit Gundam: The Origin: Advent of the Red Comet. Released digitally through Universal J on September 6, 2019, it peaked at number 79 on Billboard Japans Japan Hot 100, but reached number 15 on their Hot Animation chart, which tracks anime and video game music. The song was also later included in a limited edition of their album Cross.

Track listing

Chart position

Other cover versions 
 Chie Nakamura covered the song on the 2008 various artists album Hyakka Seiren: Josei Seiyū-hen - 2.
 Starving Trancer feat. Hideki covered the song on the 2009 various artists album Exit Trance Presents Speed: Anime Trance Bitter.
 SawanoHiroyuki[nZk]:Aimer covered the song as a bonus track in the 2016 soundtrack album Mobile Suit Gundam RE:0096 Complete Best (Limited Edition).
 Hiroko Moriguchi covered the song on her 2019 album Gundam Song Covers. She re-recorded the song with TM Network on her 2022 album Gundam Song Covers 3.

References

External links 
 
 

1988 singles
1988 songs
2019 singles
Gundam songs
Japanese-language songs
Songs written by Tetsuya Komuro
Epic Records singles
Luna Sea songs
Universal Music Japan singles